The women's 4 x 400 metres relay event  at the 2000 European Athletics Indoor Championships was held on February 27.

Results

References
Results

4 × 400 metres relay at the European Athletics Indoor Championships
400
2000 in women's athletics